The Duncan Hunter National Defense Authorization Act for Fiscal Year 2009, Public Law 110-417, was the United States federal law specifying the annual budget and expenditures of the U.S. Department of Defense for fiscal year 2009. It was so named to "[express] the sense of Congress that the Honorable Duncan Hunter, Representative from California, has discharged his official duties with integrity and distinction, [had] served the House of Representatives and the American people selflessly, and [deserved] the sincere gratitude of Congress and the Nation".

In this Act, Division A provided for Department of Defense authorizations, Division B provided for military construction authorizations; and Division C covered Department of Energy National Security Authorizations and other authorizations.

Clean Contracting Act of 2008
Title 8, Subtitle G: Governmentwide Acquisition Improvements, is known as the Clean Contracting Act of 2008 , and focused on improvements to government procurement such as limiting the term of both civilian and defense non-competitive contracts to one year (section 862) and prohibiting excessive use by contractors of sub-contractors or "tiers of sub-contractors" (section 866). Section 864(d) required the Office of Management and Budget to report annually on the use of cost-reimbursement contracts by executive agencies. Reporting requirements for 2009 and 2010 were fulfilled in a letter dated 8 July 2011 sent to the Chairman of the Senate Committee on Homeland Security and Government Affairs, which reported that $163.13 billion were obligated in cost-reimbursement contracts in 2009 (including a proportion of "combination contracts" likely to have reflected a cost-reimbursement typology), along with $31.31 billion in time-and-materials contracts and labour-hour contracts which OMB noted as carrying a comparable risk to cost-reimbursement contracts.

References

U.S. National Defense Authorization Acts